Bessemer City High School is a high school in the Gaston County Schools school district located in Bessemer City, NC. Its attendance range covers the central part of western Gaston County, and it also serves the eastern portion of the community of Tryon, parts of north western Gastonia, and the surrounding rural area. Sheila Wyont serves as principal. Tom Potter and Melissa Knick are the assistant principal's. Larry Boone serves as athletic director  The feeder school is Bessemer City Middle School.

Notable alumni
 Phillip Crosby, NFL player
 Kevin Millwood, MLB pitcher and 1999 All-Star selection
 Jimmy Wayne, country music singer and songwriter

References

External links
 Bessemer City High School official website

Public high schools in North Carolina
Schools in Gaston County, North Carolina